This article refers to sports broadcasting contracts in Thailand. For a list of rights in other countries, see Sports television broadcast contracts.

Must-have regulations are applied to multi-national sport events coverage in Thailand. There are seven multi-national sport events; Southeast Asian Games, ASEAN Para Games, Asian Games, Asian Para Games, Summer Olympic Games, Summer Paralympic Games and FIFA World Cup; are all required to air on free-to-air channels.

Multi-discipline events
Summer Olympic Games
1972–present Terrestrial: The Television Pool of Thailand (Analogue Black and White TV: Channel 4, Channel 7; Colour TV: Channel 3, Channel 5 (7 in BWTV), Channel 7, Channel 9 (4 in BWTV; now Channel 9 MCOT HD), Channel 11 (now NBT) )
2012 Cable/Satellite: ESPN Asia (on TrueVisions)
2016–present IPTV: Advanced Info Service PCL. (on AIS Play Application Software)
2020 Terrestrial: Sports Authority of Thailand ( GMM25, JKN18, PPTV, NBT, ThaiPBS, and True4U)
2020 Cable/Satellite: beIN Sports
Winter Olympic Games 
2014: Workpoint TV (Highlights, Opening and Closing Ceremonies in Terrestrial only)
2022: TBA
Asian Games
1970–present Terrestrial: The Television Pool of Thailand (Analogue Black and White TV: Channel 4, Channel 7; Colour TV: Channel 3, Channel 5, Channel 7, Channel 9 (now Channel 9 MCOT HD), Channel 11 (now NBT) )
2014 Cable/Satellite: beIN Sports (on TrueVisions)
2018 Terrestrial: Workpoint TV and PPTV
Southeast Asian Games
1969–present: The Television Pool of Thailand (Analogue Terrestrial Black and White TV: Channel 4, Channel 7; Colour TV: Channel 3, Channel 5, Channel 7, Channel 9, Channel 11 (now NBT) )
2017: IPTV: True Corporation (on TrueID)

Football

Television

FIFA

National teams 
World Cup
1970–1998: The Television Pool of Thailand (Analogue Terrestrial Black and White TV: Channel 4, Channel 7; Colour TV: Channel 3, Channel 5, Channel 7, Channel 9)
2002: Dhospaak Communication Agency Company Limited; subsidiary company of Thai Beverages PCL. (Analog Terrestrial: Channel 3, Channel 5, Channel 7, Modernine TV (Channel 9), Channel 11)
2006/2010/2014: RS Public Company Limited (Terrestrial: Channel 3, Channel 5, Channel 7, Modernine TV, NBT (Channel 11); Satellite: RS FIFA World Cup Channel on RS Sunbox (on TrueVisions only 2014) )
2018/2022: TrueVisions (Terrestrial: Channel 5, True4U, Amarin TV; Satellite: TrueVisions; Cable: TrueVisions)
Women's World Cup
 2019: beIN Sports (Terrestrial: PPTV (7 of 52 matches, one opening group match, all three Thailand group stage matches, both semi finals, and a final); Cable/Satellite: TrueVisions (all 52 matches))

Clubs 

 Club World Cup
 2015-2018: PPTV
International Champions Cup
2015–present: PPTV

AFC

National teams 

2022 FIFA World Cup - AFC qualification
2015–2016, 2019–present: Thairath TV (all Thai National Team matches in 2nd round only, except away match vs Iraq in 2016)
2016: GMM B Company Limited (Terrestrial: One HD) (away match vs Iraq in 2nd round only)
2016–2018: BBTV Company Limited. Terrestrial: Channel 7 (Thai National Team matches only), Digital: Bugaboo, Cable/Satellite: Fox Sports Asia (TrueVisions) (all matches, starting from 3rd round)
2021–present : Eleven Sports
Asian Cup
2019: BBTV Company Limited (Terrestrial: Channel 7) (Thai National Team matches only), Digital: Bugaboo, Cable/Satellite: Fox Sports Asia (TrueVisions) (all matches)
2023: Eleven Sports
AFC U-23, U-19, and U-16 Championships (National Teams)
Present: BBTV Company Limited (Terrestrial: Channel 7) (Thai National Team matches in finals tournament only), Digital: Bugaboo, Cable/Satellite: Fox Sports Asia (TrueVisions) (all matches)
2019: Bangkok Media and Broadcasting Co., Ltd. (Terrestrial: PPTV) (Thai National U-23 Team matches in qualification only)
2021–present : Eleven Sports

Clubs 

AFC Champions League
2017–2020 Terrestrial: BBTV Company Limited (Channel 7) (Thai team only), Digital: Bugaboo
–2020: Cable/Satellite: Fox Sports Asia (TrueVisions)
2021–present: TrueVisions
AFC Cup
2017–2020 Digital: BBTV Company Limited: Bugaboo
–2020: Cable/Satellite: Fox Sports Asia (TrueVisions)
2021–present: TrueVisions
Japanese J. League
J1
1990s: Channel 9 (Terrestrial)
2000s: itv (Terrestrial)
2011–2014: GMM B Company Limited (Satellite: GMM Z)
2014-2016: CTH Public Company Limited (Satellite: CTH Stadium)
2017-2019: TrueVisions (Terrestrial: True4U; Cable/Satellite: True Sport)
2020–2022: Siam Sport Syndicate PCL. (Terrestrial: Channel 9 MCOT HD; Digital: YouTube) (including Cup)
J2
2020–Present: YouTube
Australian A-League
2011–2014: GMM B Company Limited (Satellite: GMM Z)
2017–Present: beIN Sports
 Indian Super League
2020–Present: 1PlaySports (Digital: YouTube)
Korean K-League
 2020–Present: COPA90 (Digital: YouTube)
 UAE Pro League (including Cup and Super Cup)
 2020–Present: 1PlaySports (Digital: YouTube)

AFF

National teams 

AFF Championship
2008–2020;Terrestrial: BBTV Company Limited (Channel 7) (Thai national team only); Digital: Bugaboo;
2008-2016; Cable/Satellite: Fox Sports Asia (TrueVisions)
2022-2024;Terrestrial: MCOT HD (Channel 9) (Thai national team only); Digital: T-Sports 7
AFF U-22 Championship
 2019: Bangkok Media and Broadcasting Co., Ltd. (Terrestrial: PPTV) (only broadcast 7 of 16 matches; all 5 Thai national team plus semi-final and third place matches)
2022: TrueVisions (Cable/Satellite: True Sport)

Thailand

National teams 
A-team
Before 2014: Channel 7
2015–Present: Thairath TV (friendlies and FIFA World Cup - AFC qualification 2nd round only)
2016–2018: BBTV Company Limited. Terrestrial: Channel 7. Digital: Bugaboo. Cable/Satellite: Fox Sports Asia (TrueVisions) (for the FIFA World Cup - AFC qualification 3rd round)
U-23
 2014–2020: BBTV Company Limited. Terrestrial: Channel 7. Digital: Bugaboo. Cable/Satellite: Fox Sports Asia (TrueVisions) (AFC U-23 Championship finals only)
 2019: Bangkok Media and Broadcasting Co., Ltd. (Terrestrial: PPTV) (2019 AFF U-22 Youth Championship and 2020 AFC U-23 Championship qualification matches)

Clubs 

Thai League 1
2002–2008/2011– March 2020: TrueVisions (Terrestrial: True4U (2014–2020); Cable/Satellite: True Sport)
2009–2010: Siam Sport Syndicate PCL. (Satellite: Siam Sport TVs)
September 2020–present: National Broadcasting Services of Thailand
Thai League 2
2010: Siam Sport Syndicate PCL. (Satellite: Siam Sport TVs)
2011– March 2020: TrueVisions (Terrestrial: TNN24 (2014-2020); Cable/Satellite: True Sport)
TBA 2020–present: National Broadcasting Services of Thailand
Thai League 3
2018–2020: Mycujoo
TBA 2020–present: National Broadcasting Services of Thailand
Thai League 4
2009–2017: Siam Sport Syndicate PCL. (Terrestrial: NOW26 (2016–Present) Cable/Satellite: Siam Sport Channels, T-Sports Channel)
2018–2020: Mycujoo
Thai FA Cup
2009–2010: Siam Sport Syndicate PCL. (Satellite: Siam Sport TVs)
2011–2019: TrueVisions (Terrestrial: True4U; Cable/Satellite: True Sport)
2020–present: National Broadcasting Services of Thailand
Thai League Cup
2010: Siam Sport Syndicate PCL. (Satellite: Siam Sport TVs)
2011–March 2020: TrueVisions (Terrestrial: True4U; Cable/Satellite: True Sport)
TBA 2020–present: National Broadcasting Services of Thailand

UEFA

National teams 

European Championships
Men's/Boys
A-team (finals only)
2004: Dentsu X (Terrestrial: Channel 3, Channel 7)
2008: RS Public Company Limited (Terrestrial: Channel 7, Modernine TV)
2012: GMM B Company Limited; subsidiary company of GMM Grammy PCL. (Terrestrial: Channel 3, Channel 5, Modernine TV; Satellite: GMM Z)
2016: CTH Public Company Limited (transfer form GMM B) (Terrestrial: Channel 3; Cable/Satellite: CTH Stadium)
2021 (originally 2020): Summit Footwear Company Limited (Terrestrial: NBT, Channel 3, PPTV; Cable/Satellite: TrueVisions)
U-21
2011: Demeter Media Corporation (Terrestrial: Channel 9 MCOT HD (Modernine TV))
2013: GMM B Company Limited (Satellite and digital: GMM Sport)
2015: Bangkok Media and Broadcasting Company Limited (Terrestrial: PPTV, Cable/Satellite: TrueVisions, GMM Z, Good TV, AIS)
2017–present: UEFA (Digital: Youtube (2017 only) and UEFA.tv)
U-17 and U-19
2016–present: UEFA (Digital: Youtube (2016-May 2019) and UEFA.tv (July 2019 – present))
Women's/Girls
A-team
2017: UEFA (Digital: Youtube (2017 only))
2022 (originally 2021): TBA
U-17 and U-19
2016–present: UEFA (Digital: Youtube (2016-May 2019) and UEFA.tv (July 2019 – present))
European Qualifiers
2014–2018: GMM B Company Limited (Terrestrial: Channel 3, One HD; Satellite: GMM Z)
2019–2022: UEFA (Digital: UEFA.tv)
UEFA Nations League
2018–2019: none
2020–2022: UEFA (Digital: UEFA.tv)
The Football Association (England)
2012–2018: BBTV Company Limited (Terrestrial: Channel 7)
Deutscher Fußball-Bund (Germany)
2012–2018: BBTV Company Limited (Terrestrial: Channel 7) (A-team)
Youtube (all home and selected away matches of qualifiers and friendlies for men's (U-21 and U-20 only) and women's teams with the exception if the match involved the Thailand national football team)

Clubs

UEFA Champions League
1998/1999 Terrestrial: Channel 11)
2007–2012 Terrestrial: Channel 3, Channel 7; Cable/Satellite: TrueVisions (True Sport)
2012–2015: TrueVisions (Terrestrial: Channel 3, Channel 7; Cable/Satellite: True Sport)
2015–2018, 2021-2024: beIN Sports (Terrestrial: true4U (2015–2016), PPTV (2016–2018); Cable/Satellite: TrueVisions)
2018–2020: DAZN (Digital: Goal.com)
2020-2021: UEFA (Digital: UEFA.tv)
2021-2024: beIN Sports
UEFA Europa League
 2012–2015: TrueVisions (Terrestrial: Channel 3, Channel 5; Cable/Satellite: True Sport)
2015–2018, 2021-2024: beIN Sports (Terrestrial: true4U (2015–2016), PPTV (2016–2018); Cable/Satellite: TrueVisions)
2018–2021: DAZN (Digital: Goal.com)
2020-2021: UEFA (Digital: UEFA.tv)
2021-2024: beIN Sports
UEFA Europa Conference League
2021-2024: beIN Sports 
UEFA Super Cup
1998/1999 Terrestrial: Channel 11 (Champions League only)
2007–2012 Terrestrial: Channel 3, Channel 7 (Champions League only); Cable/Satellite: TrueVisions (True Sport)
2012–2015: TrueVisions (Terrestrial: Channel 3, Channel 5 (Europa League), Channel 7 (Champions League only); Cable/Satellite: True Sport)
2015–2017, 2021-2024: beIN Sports (Terrestrial: true4U (2015–2016), PPTV (2016–2018); Cable/Satellite: TrueVisions)
2018–2021: DAZN (Digital: Goal.com)
UEFA Youth League
2013–2015: Discovery (Cable/Satellite: Eurosport (GMM Z))
2015–2019: YouTube
2019–2020: DAZN (Digital: Goal.com)
2020-2021: UEFA (Digital: UEFA.tv)
2021-2024: beIN Sports
UEFA Women's Champions League
2019–2020, 2021-2025: DAZN (Digital: Goal.com) (2019-2020 only aired a final)
-2021: beIN Sports (Cable/Satellite: TrueVisions) (PSG matches only, exclude final),
2020-2021: UEFA (Digital: UEFA.tv)
English Premier League
1993–1998 Satellite/MMDS: International Broadcasting Corporation (IBC)
1995s: TV Forum/Traffic Corner on Channel 9 (Terrestrial)
1998–2007: United Broadcasting Corporation (UBC; Cable/Satellite/MMDS)
2007–2013: TrueVisions (Terrestrial: Channel 3, Modernine TV; Cable/Satellite: UBC Super Sport/True Sport)
2013–2016: CTH Public Company Limited (Terrestrial: Modernine TV (2013–2014), Channel 3 (2014–2015), PPTV (2015–2016); Cable/Satellite: CTH Stadium)
2016–2019: beIN Sports (Terrestrial: PPTV (2016–2019); Cable/Satellite: TrueVisions)
2019-2022: TrueVisions (Terrestrial: PPTV (2019–Present); Cable/Satellite: True Premier Football)
English FA Cup/Community Shield
2012–2018: BBTV Company Limited (Terrestrial: Channel 7)
2018–present: beIN Sports (Cable/Satellite: TrueVisions)
English Football League Championship/EFL Cup (Football League Cup)
2012–2015: GMM B Company Limited (Terrestrial: Modernine TV; Satellite: GMM Z)
2016–2017: Demeter Media Corporation (Terrestrial: Channel 9 MCOT HD (Modernine TV), MCOT Family)
2018–present: Bangkok Media and Broadcasting Company Limited (Terrestrial: PPTV, Cable/Satellite: TrueVisions, GMM Z, Good TV, AIS)
Scottish Professional Football League
2014-2016, 2020–present: beIN Sports (Cable/Satellite: TrueVisions)
Spanish La Liga
2012–2015: RS Public Company Limited (Terrestrial: Channel 7; Cable/Satellite: RS Sun Channel on RS Sunbox (on TrueVisions in 2014–2015) )
2015–present: beIN Sports (Terrestrial: true4U (2015–2016), PPTV (2016–Present); Cable/Satellite: TrueVisions)
Spanish King's Cup
2012–2015: RS Public Company Limited (Cable/Satellite: RS Sun Channel on RS Sunbox (on TrueVisions in 2014–2015) )
Spanish Super Cup
2016: Demeter Media Corporation (Terrestrial: MCOT Family)
German Bundesliga
1980s: Channel 9 (Terrestrial)
1990s: Channel 3 (Terrestrial)
1995s: TV Forum/Traffic Corner on Channel 9 (Terrestrial)
2012-2015: GMM B Company Limited (Terrestrial: PPTV (2014–15); Satellite: GMM Z)
2015-2020: Fox Sports Asia (Cable/Satellite: TrueVisions)
2015–present: Bangkok Media and Broadcasting Company Limited (Terrestrial: PPTV)
German DFB-Pokal
2012–Present: BBTV Company Limited (Terrestrial: Channel 7; Digital: Bugaboo)
German DFL-Supercup
2015-2019: Fox Sports Asia (Terrestrial: PPTV (2015–2018); Cable/Satellite: TrueVisions)
Italian Calcio Serie A
1990s: Channel 9 (Terrestrial)
2000s: itv (Terrestrial)
Present: beIN Sports (Terrestrial: PPTV (2016–2019); Cable/Satellite: TrueVisions)
French Ligue 1
2012-2015: GMM B Company Limited (Terrestrial: GMM One (2014–15); Satellite: GMM Z)
Present: beIN Sports (Cable/Satellite: TrueVisions)
Dutch Eredivisie
2015–2018: Fox Sports Asia (Terrestrial: Demeter Media Corporation on Channel 9 MCOT HD and MCOT Family; Cable/Satellite: TrueVisions)
Portuguese Liga NOS
1990s: Channel 3 (Terrestrial)
2000s: ESPN Star Sports
Turkish Süper Lig
2017–2020: beIN Sports (Cable/Satellite: TrueVisions)
 Austrian ÖFB Cup
 2020–present: beIN Sports (Cable/Satellite: TrueVisions) (final only)
 Danish Superliga,
 2019–present (originally from June 2020): Fox Sports Asia (Cable/Satellite: TrueVisions)
 Danish DBU Pokalen
 2019–present: Fox Sports Asia (Cable/Satellite: TrueVisions) (three matches (both semi finals and a final))

CAF
Africa Cup of Nations
2013: BBTV Company Limited (Terrestrial: Channel 7; Satellite: Media Channel; IPTV: Bugaboo TV)
2017–present: beIN Sports (Cable/Satellite: TrueVisions)
2017 Africa Cup of Nations qualification
Present: beIN Sports (Cable/Satellite: TrueVisions)

CONMEBOL

National team 

Copa América
2011: BBTV Company Limited (Terrestrial: Channel 7; Satellite: Media Channel; IPTV: Bugaboo TV)
2016: TrueVisions (Cable/Satellite: True Sport)
2019–present: Bangkok Media and Broadcasting Company Limited (Terrestrial: PPTV, Cable/Satellite: TrueVisions, GMM Z, Good TV, AIS)

Clubs 

CONMEBOL Libertadores
Present: Pay-per-view (Digital: payperviewaccess.com) (final only)
Argentine Primera División
2012-2013: GMM B Company Limited (Satellite: GMM Z)
2016-2019: beIN Sports (Cable/Satellite: TrueVisions)
2019–present: Fanatiz
Copa Argentina
2016-2018: beIN Sports (Cable/Satellite: TrueVisions)
2019–present: Fanatiz
Brazilian Campeonato Brasileiro Série A
2012-2013: GMM B Company Limited (Satellite: GMM Z)
2018 and 2019: Youtube
2020 and 2021: Fanatiz
Brazilian Copa do Brasil
2012-2013: GMM B Company Limited (Satellite: GMM Z)

CONCACAF

National teams 

CONCACAF Gold Cup
2015: TrueVisions (Cable/Satellite: True Sport)
2019: CONCACAF (Digital: ConcacafGO)
2021: beIN Sports
 CONCACAF Nations League
 2019–present: CONCACAF (Digital: ConcacafGO)

Club 

American Major League Soccer
2014-2022: beIN Sports (Cable/Satellite: TrueVisions)
 CONCACAF Champions League
 2020–present: YouTube

Radio

Various tournaments

FM 99 Active radio and FM 96 Sport FM (closed in 2020)

European Clubs
English Premier League
2016–2019: talkSPORT/Chang Siam Group

Combat sports

Boxing 

 Premier Boxing Champions
 2015-2019: beIN Sports (Cable/Satellite: TrueVisions)
2019–present: Bangkok Media and Broadcasting Company Limited (Terrestrial: PPTV, Cable/Satellite: TrueVisions, GMM Z, Good TV, AIS)
-present: Fight Sports
 Top Rank
 2018–present: Bangkok Media and Broadcasting Company Limited (Terrestrial: PPTV, Cable/Satellite: TrueVisions, GMM Z, Good TV, AIS) and FITE TV
 Matchroom Sport
DAZN
 Golden Boy
 DAZN
 Dream Boxing
 DAZN: October 2022 to October 2025, all fights
 The Fighter World Boxing 
2019–2020: One 31
2020–2022: Thairath TV
2022–present: Workpoint TV
 NKL Boxing (before WP Boxing)
2018–2021: Workpoint TV
2022–present: Thairath TV

Kickboxing 
King of Kings: DAZN: October 2022 to October 2025, all fights

Mixed Martial Arts 

Bushido MMA
DAZN: October 2022 to October 2025, all fights
 Ultimate Fighting Championship
 2013–2021: Fox Sports Asia (Cable/Satellite: TrueVisions)
 2021–present: TrueVisions (Cable/Satellite: True Sport)
 ONE Championship
 -2022: Workpoint TV and Thairath TV
 2022–present: BBTV Company Limited (Channel 7); Digital: Bugaboo

Muay Thai 

 MAX Muay Thai
Present: MCOT HD and Amarin TV
Muay Hardcore
Present: Channel 8
Super Champ
 Present: Channel 8
Thai Fight
Present: Channel 8
Rangsit Stadium
Present: True Sport
Muaydee Vitheethai
2011–2016: NBT HD
2016–2019: 3 SD
2020–2021: GMM 25
2021–present: PPTV HD 36 
2022–present: MCOT HD
Rajadamnern World Series
Present: Workpoint TV
Thai Fight
2010–2019: Channel 3
2020–present: Channel 8

Futsal
FIFA Futsal World Cup
2012: Adamas World Company Limited (Terrestrial: Modernine TV, Cable/Satellite: T-Sports Channel)
2016; BBTV Company Limited (Terrestrial: Channel 7)
AFC Futsal Club Championship
2017–2020: BBTV Company Limited (Terrestrial: Channel 7)
2021–present: TBA
Futsal Thailand League
2016–Present: Thairath TV

American Football
NFL
Present: TrueVisions (Cable/Satellite: True Sport)
Super Bowl
Present: TrueVisions (Terrestrial: True4U (2015); Cable/Satellite: True Sport)

Baseball 

 World Baseball Classic
 2017–present : Fox Sports Asia (Cable/Satellite: TrueVisions)
 Major League Baseball
 present : Fox Sports Asia (Cable/Satellite: TrueVisions)
 Korea Baseball Organization
 2020–present : Fox Sports Asia (Cable/Satellite: TrueVisions)

Basketball
NBA
Present: NBA TV (Terrestrial: True4U (2015); Cable/Satellite: TrueVisions)
WNBA
Present: TrueVisions (Cable/Satellite: True Sport)
FIBA Asia Challenge
2016: MONO29 (Terrestrial)
ASEAN Basketball League
Present: MONO29 (Terrestrial)
Thailand Basketball League
2014–Present: MONO29

Golf
European Tour
Present: Golf Channel (Cable/Satellite: TrueVisions)
PGA Tour
Present: TrueVisions (Cable/Satellite: True Sport)
LPGA Tour
Present: Fox Sports Asia & BBTV Company Limited (Selected events on Channel 7 on terrestrial only) (Cable/Satellite: TrueVisions)

Motor Racing
Formula One
 –2021: Fox Sports Asia (Cable/Satellite: TrueVisions)
 2021–2022: TrueVisions (Cable/Satellite: True Sport)
 2023-present: beIN Sports
World Rally Championship
Present: TrueVisions (Cable/Satellite: True Sport)
MotoGP
–2021: Fox Sports Asia (Cable/Satellite: TrueVisions)
2021–present: SPOTV (Cable/Satellite: TrueVisions)
2015-2017: BEC-Tero Entertainment Co., Ltd. (Terrestrial: 3 SD)
2018–present: Bangkok Media and Broadcasting Co., Ltd. (Terrestrial: PPTV)
 Formula E
 2014-2020: Fox Sports Asia
 2021–present: DAZN

Rugby

Union 

Rugby World Cup
1999-2011: ESPNStar (Cable/Satellite: TrueVisions)
2015: Fox Sports Asia (Cable/Satellite: TrueVisions)
2019–present: beIN Sports (Cable/Satellite: TrueVisions)
Six Nations Championship
2011-2013: Cable/Satellite: Setanta Sports Asia/True Sport HD4 (TrueVisions)
2017–2020: Discovery (Cable/Satellite: Eurosport (GMM Z) (2017 only) and Rugby Pass (TrueVisions); Digital: Rugbypass.com)
2021–present: Premier Media (Digital: Premier Sports)
EPCR
2014–2020: Discovery (Cable/Satellite: Rugby Pass (TrueVisions); Digital: Rugbypass.com)
2020–present: beIN Sports (Cable/Satellite: TrueVisions)
English Premiership
–2020: Discovery (Cable/Satellite: Rugby Pass (TrueVisions); Digital: Rugbypass.com)
2021–present: Premier Media (Digital: Premier Sports)
Pro14
–Present: Discovery (Cable/Satellite: Rugby Pass (TrueVisions); Digital: Rugbypass.com)
2021–present: Premier Media (Digital: Premier Sports)
Currie Cup
Present: Discovery (Cable/Satellite: Rugby Pass (TrueVisions); Digital: Rugbypass.com)
 World Rugby Sevens Series
 Present: YouTube

League 

Australian National Rugby League
???-2017: Setanta Sports (Cable/Satellite: TrueVisions; Digital: Rugbypass.com)
 NRL National Youth Competition
???-2017: Setanta Sports (Cable/Satellite: TrueVisions; Digital: Rugbypass.com)
Super League
Present: Rugby Pass (Cable/Satellite: TrueVisions; Digital: Rugbypass.com)

Volleyball
FIVB Volleyball Women's Nations League and Men's , Men's and Women's Club World Championship
2017–2020: BEC World (Terrestrial: Channel 3)
2022–present: GMM Grammy (Terrestrial: ONE 31 & GMM 25)
FIVB Volleyball Women's World Championship
2018: (Terrestrial: Workpoint TV)
FIVB Volleyball Women's World Cup
2019: (Terrestrial: Workpoint TV)
FIVB World Grand Champions Cup
2013: BBTV Company Limited (Terrestrial: Channel 7)
FIVB Beach Volleyball World Tour
2016: TrueVisions (Cable/Satellite: True Sport)
Volleyball Thailand League
2015–2020: TrueVisions (Terrestrial: True4U; Cable/Satellite: True Sport; Digital: True ID)
Volleyball Thailand Super League
2018–present : BEC World (Terrestrial: Channel 13; Satellite: SMM TV)
AVC tournaments:
2016–present : SMM (Terrestrial: Thairath TV (until 2019) and PPTV (from 2020–present)

Tennis
Wimbledon
-2021: Fox Sports Asia (Terrestrial: Thairath TV (finals only); Cable/Satellite: TrueVisions)
2022-present: SPOTV
Australian Open
-2021: Fox Sports Asia (Terrestrial: Thairath TV (finals only); Cable/Satellite: TrueVisions)
2022-present: beIN Sports
French Open
-2021: Fox Sports Asia (Terrestrial: Thairath TV (finals only); Cable/Satellite: TrueVisions)
2022-present: beIN Sports
U.S. Open
-2021: Fox Sports Asia (Terrestrial: Thairath TV (finals only); Cable/Satellite: TrueVisions)
2022-present: SPOTV
ATP World Tour
Present: TrueVisions (Cable/Satellite: True Sport)
WTA tour
Present: TrueVisions (Cable/Satellite: True Sport)
Davis Cup
2015-2018: beIN Sports (Cable/Satellite: TrueVisions)
2019–present: Rakuten (Digital: Rakuten Sports)
Fed Cup
2015-2018: beIN Sports (Cable/Satellite: TrueVisions)
2019: Fox Sports Asia (Cable/Satellite: TrueVisions (final only))

Others 
FINA Swimming World Cup
2016: TrueVisions (Cable/Satellite: True Sport)
ITTF World Tour
Present: TrueVisions (Cable/Satellite: True Sport)
UIPM Modern Pentathlon World Championship
Present: beIN Sports (Cable/Satellite: TrueVisions)
Formula 1 Powerboat World Championship
Present: beIN Sports (Cable/Satellite: TrueVisions)
America's Cup World Series
Present: TrueVisions (Cable/Satellite: True Sport)
UCI Mountain Bike World Cup
Present: TrueVisions (Cable/Satellite: True Sport)
Snooker UK Championship
Present: TrueVisions (Cable/Satellite: True Sport)
 ICC
 Present: Fox Sports Asia (Cable/Satellite: True Sport)
 Caribbean Premier League
 2020–present: 1PlaySports (Digital: Youtube)

References

Thailand
Television in Thailand